Turab Ali (born 8 February 1920, year of death unknown) was an Indian cricketer. He played first-class cricket for Delhi and Punjab between 1945 and 1958. Ali is deceased.

See also
 List of Delhi cricketers

References

External links
 

1920 births
Year of death missing
Indian cricketers
Delhi cricketers
Punjab (Pakistan) cricketers
Cricketers from Delhi